In algebra, the Artin–Tate lemma, named after Emil Artin and John Tate, states:
Let A be a commutative Noetherian ring and  commutative algebras over A. If C is of finite type over A and if C is finite over B, then B is of finite type over A.
(Here, "of finite type" means "finitely generated algebra" and "finite" means "finitely generated module".) The lemma was introduced by E. Artin and J. Tate in 1951 to give a proof of Hilbert's Nullstellensatz.

The lemma is similar to the Eakin–Nagata theorem, which says: if C is finite over B and C is a Noetherian ring, then B is a Noetherian ring.

Proof 

The following proof can be found in  Atiyah–MacDonald. Let  generate  as an -algebra and let  generate  as a -module. Then we can write

Since  is a finitely generated -algebra, also  is a finitely generated -algebra.

Noetherian necessary 
Without the assumption that A is Noetherian, the statement of the Artin–Tate lemma is no longer true. Then for any ideal  which is not finitely generated,  is not of finite type over A, but all conditions as in the lemma are satisfied.

References

External links 
http://commalg.subwiki.org/wiki/Artin-Tate_lemma

Theorems about algebras
Lemmas in algebra
Commutative algebra